The 117th Air Refueling Squadron (117 ARS) is a unit of the Kansas Air National Guard 190th Air Refueling Wing located at Forbes Field Air National Guard Base, Topeka, Kansas. The 117th is equipped with the KC-135R Stratotanker.

History

World War II

Established in mid-1942 as the 440th Bombardment Squadron; equipped with B-26 Marauder medium bombers.   Trained in the Southeastern United States under III Bomber Command.  Was deployed to North Africa in late 1942 as part of Twelfth Air Force, operated from desert airfields in Morocco, Algeria and Tunisia.   The squadron attacked enemy railroads, airfields, harbor installations, and shipping along the Mediterranean Coast.   Moved to Sicily and Italy and participated in the Italian Campaign, attacking targets in Italy supporting the Fifth Army advanced in the Cassino and Anzio areas.  The squadron later attacked targets in the Rome area, then moved to Corsica to support the Allied landings in Southern France.  Remaining in Corsica, the squadron later hit railroad bridges in Northern Italy and late in the year attacked railroad lines through the Brenner Pass that connected Germany and Austria with Italy.

In January 1945, the squadron returned to the United States, where it began to train with A-26 Invader aircraft for operations in the Pacific Theater. Between May and July 1945, moved by ship to Okinawa, and on 16 July flew its first mission against Japan. From then until the end of the fighting in early August, the squadron attacked enemy targets such as airfields and industrial centers on Kyūshū and occupied Shanghai area of China, and shipping around the Ryukyu Islands and in the East China Sea.  In November and December 1945, the squadron returned to the United States and was inactivated.

Pennsylvania Air National Guard
The wartime 440th Bombardment Squadron was re-designated as the 117th Bombardment Squadron (Light) and allocated to the Pennsylvania Air National Guard on 24 May 1946. It was organized at Philadelphia International Airport and was extended federal recognition on 17 January 1947 by the National Guard Bureau. The 117th bombardment Squadron was bestowed the history, honors, and colors of the 440th Bombardment Squadron. The squadron was equipped with A-26 Invaders and was assigned to the PA ANG 53d Fighter Wing. It was later assigned to the 111th Bombardment Group, upon its activation on 20 December 1948.

Korean War activation
On 1 April 1951 the 117th Bombardment Squadron was federalized and brought to active-duty due to the Korean War. It was initially assigned to Tactical Air Command (TAC), and moved to Langley AFB, Virginia.   At Langley, the squadron was assigned to the TAC 4400th Combat Crew Training Group.   Its mission was the training of B-26 Invader aircrews in Tactical night intruder air operations.  The crews trained by the 117th were later deployed to Far East Air Forces for combat operations with B-26s over North and South Korea.  On 1 November 1952 the squadron was inactivated and returned to Pennsylvania Commonwealth Control on 1 January 1953.

Cold War
Returning to Philadelphia, the squadron was re-designated a Fighter-Bomber squadron, receiving F-84F Thunderstreaks and assuming a tactical mission over Philadelphia.   The PaANG took on an air defense role and a transition to F-94A/B/C aircraft and as a result the 117th Fighter-Bomber squadron was inactivated effective 1 July 1956, reducing the 111th Fighter-Bomber Group to a single squadron, the senior 103d FIS.  Its personnel were reassigned to other units in its parent Group.

Kansas Air National Guard
In early 1957, the Kansas Air National Guard received authorization to expand from one to two squadrons, and the National Guard Bureau transferred the inactive 117th designation from the Commonwealth of Pennsylvania to the State of Kansas on 3 January 1957.  It was organized at the former Naval Air Station Hutchinson (renamed Hutchinson Air National Guard Base).  The squadron was re-designated as the 117th Fighter-Interceptor Squadron, and received federal recognition on 23 February 1957 by the National Guard Bureau. The 117th Fighter-Interceptor Squadron was bestowed the history, honors, and colors of the 117th Bombardment Squadron. The squadron was equipped with F-80C Shooting Stars and was assigned to the KS ANG 184th Air Defense Wing located at McConnell Air Force Base.

RB-57 Canberra era

The Martin B-57 Canberra was a rare example of a foreign-designed military aircraft being built under license by an American manufacturing company for use by the US armed forces.  It was acquired as an interim replacement for the World War II B-26 Invader until the Douglas B-66 Destroyer could be brought into service.  The RB-57A was a reconnaissance version of the B-57A bomber.   Beginning in early 1958 with the introduction of the RB-66 to the active-duty inventory, the 117th began to receive RB-57A and twin-seat RB-57B Canberra photographic reconnaissance aircraft and assumed a Tactical Reconnaissance mission.

The RB-57s were totally unarmed. It was painted with a high gloss black paint which was intended to minimize detection by searchlights. The crew was two; one pilot and one photo-navigator. It was intended that only a minimum of effort would be required to convert the RB-57A to a bomber mission, which was never actually done in practice.

On 15 October 1962, the 117th was authorized to expand to a group level, and the 190th Tactical Reconnaissance Group was established by the National Guard Bureau. The 117th TRS becoming the group's flying squadron. Other squadrons assigned into the group were the 190th Headquarters, 190th Material Squadron (Maintenance), 190th Combat Support Squadron, and the 190th USAF Dispensary.

The unit continued to operate its Canberras at Hutchinson ANGB until 1967, when the 190th TRG and its personnel, aircraft and equipment permanently relocated to Forbes AFB, near Topeka after Strategic Air Command vacated its facilities and transferred Forbes AFB to the Tactical Air Command.   The 117th continued to operate the RB-57s until 1972 when the aged aircraft were retired and sent to AMARC at Davis-Monthan AFB, Arizona.

In return the 190th began to receive the Martin B-57G variant that were modified as night intruders for use in the Vietnam War under a project known as Tropic Moon.  B-57Bs were modified with a low light level television camera plus a forward-looking infrared (FLIR) set and a laser guidance system. The laser guidance system now made it possible to carry four 500-lb "smart bombs" on the underwing pylons.  With the receipt of the B-57Gs from their combat service in Thailand, the unit was re-designated as the 190th Tactical Bombardment Group on 12 June 1972.    The service of the B-57Gs was short, as operation of these B-57Gs proved to be expensive, and the aircraft were hard to maintain in the field.  They served until 1974, when they were consigned to storage at Davis Monthan AFB.

Forbes AFB was ordered closed by the Department of Defense as part of a post-Vietnam reduction in force on 17 April 1973. Most of the facility was turned over for civilian use, however the 190th TBG retained a small portion of the base, being renamed Forbes Field Air National Guard Base.

In April 1974, the unit converted to EB-57B Canberra electronic countermeasures aircraft and became the 190th Defense Systems Evaluation Group.   The 190th deployed aircraft to bases throughout the US, Canada, and Europe providing Electronic Counter-Measure (ECM) training and evaluation services to the various Aircraft Control and Warning (Radar) Squadrons.  The 117th also used the EB-57 as faker target aircraft against F-102 Delta Dagger and F-106 Delta Dart interceptors.  The 190th operated the aircraft until 1978 when they were retired as part of the draw-down of Aerospace Defense Command.

Air Refueling
In 1978, the 190th was transferred to Strategic Air Command, being equipped with the KC-135A Stratotanker and began an air refueling mission; one it retains to the present day.  In 1984 the 117th was upgraded to the KC-135E and in 1990, the 190th was the first unit to arrive in Saudi Arabia in August 1990 for service during the 1991 Gulf Crisis, being assigned to the 1709th Air Refueling Wing (Provisional) at King Abdul Aziz Air Base, Jeddah, Saudi Arabia.   The 117th flew air refueling missions in support of Operation Desert Shield and later Operation Desert Storm; remaining in the middle east until returning to Forbes AGB in March 1991.

The 190th gaining command shifted to the Air Mobility Command (AMC) with the disestablishment of SAC in 1992, and in 1995 the Group's status was expanded to a Wing.  During 1999, the 190th deployed twice to Incirlik Air Base, Turkey, in support of Operation Northern Watch, refueling Allied aircraft over the northern No-Fly Zone in Iraq.

In its 2005 BRAC Recommendations, DoD recommended to realign McConnell Air National Guard (ANG) Base by relocating the 184th Air Refueling Wing (ANG) nine KC-135R aircraft to the 190th Air Refueling Wing at Forbes Field AGS, which would retire its eight assigned KC-135E aircraft. The 184th Air Refueling Wing 's operations and maintenance manpower would transfer with the aircraft to Forbes. Realigning ANG KC-135R aircraft from McConnell to Forbes would replace the 190th's aging, higher maintenance KC-135E aircraft with newer models while retaining the experienced personnel from one of the highest-ranking reserve component tanker bases.

In June 2007, the 190 ARW gained custody of all KC-135R aircraft from the 184th ARW. This action consolidated all of the Kansas ANG's KC-135R assets into a single wing located at Forbes Field. The 184 ARW was subsequently re=designated as the 184th Intelligence Wing (184 IW), a non-flying unit at McConnell AFB.

Lineage

 Constituted 440th Bombardment Squadron (Medium) on 19 June 1942
 Activated on 26 June 1942
 Re-designated 440th Bombardment Squadron (Light) on 3 February 1945
 Inactivated on 4 January 1946
 Re-designated 117th Bombardment Squadron (Light), and allotted to Pennsylvania ANG, on 24 May 1946
 Extended federal recognition on 17 January 1947
 Ordered to active service on 1 April 1951
 Inactivated 1 November 1952
 Relieved from active duty and returned to Pennsylvania commonwealth control. 1 January 1953
 Re-designated: 117th Fighter-Bomber Squadron, and re-activated on 1 January 1953
 Inactivated on 1 July 1956
 Allocation to Pennsylvania ANG withdrawn, 1 February 1957
 Allotted to Kansas ANG, 1 February 1957
 Re-designated 117th Fighter-Interceptor Squadron, 1 February 1957
 Extended federal recognition and activated on 23 February 1957
 Re-designated: 117th Tactical Reconnaissance Squadron on 10 April 1958
 Re-designated: 117th Tactical Bombardment Squadron on 12 June 1972
 Re-designated: 117th Defense Systems Evaluation Squadron on 6 April 1974
 Re-designated: 117th Air Refueling Squadron on 1 April 1978

Assignments
 319th Bombardment Group, 26 June 1942
 VII Bomber Command, 18 Dec 1945 – 4 Jan 1946.
 53d Fighter Wing, 17 January 1947
 111th Bombardment Group, 20 December 1948
 4400th Combat Crew Training Group, 1 April 1951 – 1 November 1952
 111th Fighter-Bomber Group, 1 January 1953 – 1 July 1956
 131st Fighter-Bomber Wing, 23 February 1957
 131st Tactical Fighter Wing, 1 January 1960
 190th Tactical Reconnaissance Group, 15 October 1962
 190th Bombardment Group (Tactical), 12 June 1972
 190th Defense Systems Evaluation Group, 6 April 1974
 190th Air Refueling Group, 1 April 1978
 190th Air Refueling Wing, 8 July 1978
 190th Operations Group, 11 October 1995 – present

Stations

 Barksdale Field, Louisiana, 26 June 1942
 Harding Army Air Field, Louisiana, 8–27 August 1942
 RAF Shipdham (AAF-115), England, 12 September 1942
 RAF Horsham St Faith (AAF-123), England, c. 4 October 1942
 Saint-Leu Airfield, Algeria, c. 11 November 1942
 Oran Tafaraoui Airport, Algeria, 18 November 1942
 Maison Blanche Airport, Algeria, 24 November 1942
 Telergma Airfield, Algeria, c. 12 December 1942
 Oujda Airfield, French Morocco, 3 March 1943
 Rabat-Salé Airport, French Morocco, 25 April 1943
 Sedrata Airfield, Algeria, 1 June 1943
 Djedeida Airfield, Tunisia, 26 June 1943
 Decimomannu Airfield, Sardinia, c. 1 November 1943

 Serragia Airfield, Corsica, c. 21 September 1944 – 1 January 1945
 Bradley Field, Connecticut, 25 January 1945
 Columbia Army Air Base, South Carolina, c. 28 February–27 April 1945
 Kadena Airfield, Okinawa, c. 2 July 1945
 Machinato-Naha Airfield, Okinawa, 21 July–21 November 1945
 Fort Lewis, Washington, 17–18 December 1945
 Mitchel Army Airfield, New York, 27 December 1946
 Philadelphia International Airport, 17 January 1947 – 1 April 1951; 1 January 1953 – 1 July 1956
 Langley Air Force Base, Virginia, 1 April 1951 – 1 November 1952
 Hutchinson Air National Guard Base, Kansas, 23 February 1957
 Forbes Air Force Base, Kansas, 11 August 1967
 Forbes Field Air National Guard Base, Kansas, 17 April 1973 – Present

Aircraft

 B-26 Marauder, 1942–1944
 B-25 Mitchell, 1944–1945
 A-26 Invader, 1945–1946
 A-26 (later B-26) Invader, 1947–1952
 F-80C Shooting Star, 1953–1956; 1957–1958
 RB-57A/B Canberra, 1958–1972

 B-57G Canberra, 1972–1973
 RB-57B/E Canberra, 1973–1978
 KC-135A Stratotanker, 1978–1984
 KC-135E Stratotanker, 1984–2006
 KC-135R Stratotanker, 2006–present

Aircraft flying in this unit
KC-135
56-3631(E) (Feb'94); 57-1482(E) (Feb'94)

References

 Maurer, Maurer (1983). Air Force Combat Units of World War II. Maxwell AFB, AL: Office of Air Force History. .

External links
 Official site of the 190th Air Refueling Wing

Squadrons of the United States Air National Guard
Air refueling squadrons of the United States Air Force
Military units and formations in Kansas
Military units and formations established in 1962
1942 establishments in Louisiana